Hanging Lees Reservoir is a small reservoir in the Piethorne Valley in the Metropolitan Borough of Rochdale, within Greater Manchester, England. It is situated between Rooden and Piethorne Reservoirs.

References

Reservoirs in Greater Manchester